Marika Lindholm (née Eklund; born 14 April 1948) is a Finnish sprinter. She competed in the 400 metres at the 1972 Summer Olympics and the 1976 Summer Olympics.

References

External links
 

1948 births
Living people
Athletes (track and field) at the 1972 Summer Olympics
Athletes (track and field) at the 1976 Summer Olympics
Finnish female sprinters
Olympic athletes of Finland
People from Hanko
Olympic female sprinters
Sportspeople from Uusimaa